The 16th Parliament of Sri Lanka is the current Parliament of Sri Lanka, with the membership determined by the results of the 2020 parliamentary election held on 5 August 2020. According to the Constitution of Sri Lanka the maximum legislative term of the parliament is 5 years from the first meeting.

Election

The 16th Parliamentary Election was held on 5 August 2020. The incumbent party Sri Lanka People's Freedom Alliance claimed a landslide victory in the election claiming the majority winning 145 seats, while Samagi Jana Balawegaya won a total of 54 seats and National People's Power won 3 seats. The main opposition United National Party suffered their worst ever landslide defeat in the history as they claimed only one seat and was placed at fourth position in the elections.

Results 
The first official results were released on 6 August 2020 in the afternoon starting with the postal votes in the Galle District.

The SLPFA became the largest group in Parliament after securing 59.09% of votes and 145 seats whilst the SJB won 23.90% of votes and 54 seats. SLPFA managed to exceed the majority cutoff of 113 with obtaining 128 seats from election votes and 17 seats from the national list.

National

District

Government

The Sri Lanka People's Freedom Alliance was able to form a government with a supermajority, with Mahinda Rajapaksa as Prime Minister.

After country-wide protests in 2022, Mahinda Rajapaksa resigned and Ranil Wickramasinghe was appointed as his successor.

On 13 July 2022, President Gotabaya Rajapaksa fled the country and resigned on 14 July 2022. Ranil Wickremesinghe was elected president by the parliament on 20 July and Dinesh Gunawardena was appointed as prime minister by president Wickremesinghe.

Legislation

 The 20th Amendment to the Constitution of Sri Lanka was passed in October 2020.
 The 21st Amendment to the Constitution of Sri Lanka was passed in October 2022.

Composition
The following are the changes in party and alliance affiliations for the 16th parliament.

 5 April 2022
 9 SLPP MPs left the government to work as independent MPs.
 The 14 SLFP MPs, 2 CWC MPs and ACMC MP Muszhaaraff Muthunabeen left the SLPFA government and moved into opposition.
 16 MPs formerly allied with the government announced they would remain independent in the house.
 12 May 2022 − UNP MP Ranil Wickremesinghe was appointed as Prime Minister and joined the SLPFA government.
 31 August 2022 − 13 SLPP MPs left the government and crossed over to the opposition as independent MPs, including SLPP chairman G. L. Peiris and SLPP MP Dullas Alahapperuma.

Members

Deaths and resignations
 Ranjan Ramanayake lost his seat after he was jailed on 13 June 2021, replaced by Ajith Mannapperuma. 
 Jayantha Ketagoda resigned on 26 June 2021, replaced by Basil Rajapaksa.
 Ajith Nivard Cabraal resigned on 13 September 2021, replaced by Jayantha Ketagoda.
 Mahinda Samarasinghe resigned on 25 November 2021 to become Ambassador of Sri Lanka to the United States and Mexico, replaced by Lalith Varna Kumara.
 Amarakeerthi Athukorala was beaten to death by a mob on 9 May 2022, replaced by Jagath Samarawickrama.
 Basil Rajapaksa resigned on 9 June 2022, replaced by Dhammika Perera. 
 Ranil Wickremesinghe's seat became vacant on 20 July 2022 after Wickremesinghe took oaths as President of Sri Lanka, replaced by Wajira Abeywardane.
 Mujibur Rahman resigned on 19 January 2023, replaced by A. H. M. Fowzie.

List

References

Parliament of Sri Lanka
2020 establishments in Sri Lanka
2020 Sri Lankan parliamentary election